Rookwood was a railway station on Sydney's Main Suburban railway line, which served the Rookwood Cemetery. The station was located between the bridge over Arthur street and the westernmost junction of the Flemington rail yard. It consisted of two single faced platforms, one on the up suburban line and the other on the down suburban line. The adjacent stations were Lidcombe and Flemington.

History
The station opened as Necropolis sometime before 1887. Its name was changed to Rookwood on 1 January 1914. It was closed in 1967.

References

Disused railway stations in Sydney
Railway stations in Australia opened in 1887
Railway stations closed in 1967
1967 disestablishments in Australia